Orthocomotis magicana is a species of moth of the family Tortricidae. It is found in Costa Rica, Colombia and Venezuela.

References

Moths described in 1866
Orthocomotis